Suit Yourself is the ninth studio album by Shelby Lynne, released on May 24, 2005.  The album is the second consecutive self-produced album for Lynne, and one of two recorded for release by Capitol Records.  (The album's follow-up, Just a Little Lovin', was also recorded at Capitol, but would be distributed elsewhere due to the label's corporate restructuring.) The album received mainly positive reviews from critics with an average Metacritic rating of 76/100.

Lynne wrote music and lyrics for ten of the album's songs, including "Johnny Met June", a tribute to the relationship of Johnny Cash and June Carter Cash which was written on the day of Johnny Cash's death. Though the album does not explicitly state the title of its final track, "Track 12" is a cover of "Rainy Night in Georgia" written by Tony Joe White, who also composed the album's fifth song, "Old Times Sake."

In 2016, "Johnny Met June" was featured in a PSA for Sandy Hook Promise. As a result, the song entered #20 in Billboard's Country Streaming Songs.

Critical reception

Thom Jurek of AllMusic concludes a lengthy review with, "Suit Yourself is aptly named, Lynne dressed herself this time out with great players and finely wrought songs, and put it all together on her own. This is her finest moment yet."

Jason Schneider of Exclaim reviews this album and says, "This has always been how Lynne's sultry voice sounds best, and the intimacy she captures throughout the album is heart-melting at times."

T.J. Simon of The Music Box gives the album 3½ out of a possible 5 stars and concludes with, "Another impressive element of Suit Yourself is that Lynne produced the effort herself, and the mix is perfect. On future releases, Lynne would be wise to distance herself further from standard country fare and instead emphasize her soulful side, but in the meantime, there’s a lot to enjoy on Suit Yourself.

Track listing

Personnel

Musicians
 Shelby Lynne – acoustic guitar, electric guitar, lead vocals, background vocals
 Brian Harrison – bass guitar
 Bryan Owings – drums, percussion
 Benmont Tench – keyboards
 Robby Turner – dobro, mandolin, pedal steel guitar
 Michael Ward – acoustic guitar, electric guitar
 Tony Joe White – electric guitar, harmonica

Production
Shelby Lynne – Producer
Elizabeth Jordan – Executive Producer
Ron McMaster – Mastering
Jim Marshall – Photography
Brian Harrison – Mixer, Engineer
Andy Borham – Mixer
Eric Roinestad – Art Direction, Design
Ron Laffitte – A&R
Mary Fagot – Creative Director

Track information and credits adapted from the album's liner notes.

Charts

References

2005 albums
Shelby Lynne albums
Capitol Records albums